In telecommunication, an interchange circuit is a circuit that facilitates the exchange of data and signaling information between data terminal equipment (DTE) and data circuit-terminating equipment (DCE). 

An interchange circuit can carry many types of signals and provide many types of service features, such as control signals, timing signals, and common return functions.

References

Communication circuits
Telecommunications equipment